Jimmie Dale Files (born January 16, 1948 in Paris, Arkansas) is a former American football linebacker in the National Football League. He was drafted by the New York Giants 13th overall in the 1970 NFL Draft. He played college football at Oklahoma.

1948 births
Living people
People from Paris, Arkansas
Players of American football from Arkansas
American football linebackers
Oklahoma Sooners football players
New York Giants players